I (Anh. I; first Annex) of the 1978 edition of the Deutsch catalogue lists 32 compositions which are spuriously or doubtfully attributed to Franz Schubert.

Table

Legend

List

|-
| data-sort-value="040" | 40
| data-sort-value="999.10010" | Anh.I/1
| data-sort-value="ZZZZ" |
| data-sort-value="ZZZZ" |
| data-sort-value="ZZZZ" |
| data-sort-value="String Quartet, D Anh. I/1" | String Quartet, D Anh. I/1
| data-sort-value="key E-flat major" | E major
| data-sort-value="1813-01-01" | 1813
| Doubtful: lost or identical to 
|-
| data-sort-value="999.0999102" |
| data-sort-value="999.102" | Anh.I/2
| data-sort-value="ZZZZ" |
| data-sort-value="ZZZZ" |
| data-sort-value="ZZZZ" |
| data-sort-value="String Quartet, D Anh. I/2" | String Quartet, D Anh. I/2
| data-sort-value="key F major" | F major
| data-sort-value="1816-01-01" | 1816
| Doubtful: lost or identical to 
|-
| data-sort-value="999.0999103" |
| data-sort-value="999.103" | Anh.I/3
| data-sort-value="ZZZZ" |
| data-sort-value="ZZZZ" |
| data-sort-value="802,A2" | VIII, 2Anh. No. 2
| Fugue, D Anh. I/3
| data-sort-value="key C major" | C major
| data-sort-value="1812-01-01" | 1812?
| Spurious?; For string quartet?; Fragment: only viola part is extant
|-
| data-sort-value="002" | 2
| data-sort-value="999.104" | Anh.I/4
| data-sort-value="ZZZZ" |

| data-sort-value="ZZZZ" |

| data-sort-value="ZZZZ" |

| data-sort-value="ZZZZ" |

| data-sort-value="ZZZZ" |

| data-sort-value="ZZZZ" |

| Spurious: fragment of a string quartet movement in G major by 
|-
| data-sort-value="999.0999105" |
| data-sort-value="999.105" | Anh.I/5
| data-sort-value="ZZZZ" |

| data-sort-value="ZZZZ" |

| data-sort-value="ZZZZ" |

| data-sort-value="ZZZZ" |

| data-sort-value="ZZZZ" |

| data-sort-value="ZZZZ" |

| Spurious: sketch for the opening movement of a string quartet in E major
|-
| data-sort-value="999.0999106" |
| data-sort-value="999.106" | Anh.I/6
| data-sort-value="ZZZZ" |

| data-sort-value="ZZZZ" |

| data-sort-value="ZZZZ" |

| data-sort-value="ZZZZ" |

| data-sort-value="ZZZZ" |

| data-sort-value="ZZZZ" |

| Spurious: Duet in D major for two violins
|- id="D Anh. I/6A"
| data-sort-value="999.09991061" |
| data-sort-value="999.1061" | Anh.I/6A
| data-sort-value="ZZZZ" |

| data-sort-value="ZZZZ" |

| data-sort-value="ZZZZ" |

| data-sort-value="ZZZZ" |

| data-sort-value="ZZZZ" |

| data-sort-value="ZZZZ" |

| Spurious: Symphony in E major "1825" by Gunter Elsholz (fake Gmunden-Gastein Symphony)
|-
| 858
| data-sort-value="999.107" | Anh.I/7
| data-sort-value="ZZZZ" |
| data-sort-value="ZZZZ" |
| data-sort-value="714,13" | VII/1, 4
| March, D Anh. I/7
| data-sort-value="ZZZZ" |
| data-sort-value="1825-11-01" | November1825
| Doubtful; Lost; For two pianos, eight hands
|-
| data-sort-value="999.0999108" |
| data-sort-value="999.108" | Anh.I/8
| data-sort-value="ZZZZ" |
| data-sort-value="ZZZZ" |
| data-sort-value="ZZZZ" |
| Piano Sonata, D Anh. I/8
| data-sort-value="key F major" | F major
| data-sort-value="1815-01-01" | 1815
| Doubtful: lost or identical to 
|-
| data-sort-value="999.0999109" |
| data-sort-value="999.109" | Anh.I/9
| data-sort-value="ZZZZ" |
| data-sort-value="ZZZZ" |
| data-sort-value="ZZZZ" |
| Piano Sonata, D Anh. I/9
| data-sort-value="key F major" | F major
| data-sort-value="1816-01-01" | 1816
| Doubtful: lost or identical to 
|-
| data-sort-value="999.0999110" |
| data-sort-value="999.110" | Anh.I/10
| data-sort-value="ZZZZ" |
| data-sort-value="ZZZZ" |
| data-sort-value="ZZZZ" |
| Fantasy, D Anh. I/10
| data-sort-value="key E-flat major" | E major
| data-sort-value="1825-01-01" | 1825?
| Doubtful; Lost; For piano
|-
| data-sort-value="999.0999111" |
| data-sort-value="999.111" | Anh.I/11
| data-sort-value="ZZZZ" |

| data-sort-value="ZZZZ" |

| data-sort-value="ZZZZ" |

| data-sort-value="ZZZZ" |

| data-sort-value="ZZZZ" |

| data-sort-value="ZZZZ" |

| Spurious: Allegro in G major and Minuet in C major, a.k.a. Sonatina; For piano; Publ. in 1967
|-
| data-sort-value="999.0999112" |
| data-sort-value="999.112" | Anh.I/12
| data-sort-value="XXX,1810" | (1810)
| data-sort-value="ZZZZ" |
| data-sort-value="ZZZZ" |
| data-sort-value="Variations, Easy, 07" | Seven Easy Variations
| data-sort-value="key G major" | G major
| data-sort-value="1810-10-31" | beforeNov. 1810
| Spurious?; For piano
|-
| data-sort-value="999.0999113" |
| data-sort-value="999.113" | Anh.I/13
| data-sort-value="ZZZZ" |
| data-sort-value="ZZZZ" |
| data-sort-value="ZZZZ" |
| data-sort-value="German Dances, 06, D Anh. I/13" | Six German Dances, D Anh. I/13
| data-sort-value="ZZZZ" |
| data-sort-value="1814-01-01" | 1814
| Doubtful; Lost; For piano
|-
| data-sort-value="999.0999114" |
| data-sort-value="999.114" | Anh.I/14
| data-sort-value="XXX,1970" | (1970)
| data-sort-value="ZZZZ" |
| data-sort-value="801,00" | VIII, 1
| Waltz, D Anh. I/4, a.k.a. Kupelwieser-Walzer
| data-sort-value="key G-flat major" | G major
| data-sort-value="1826-09-17" | 17/9/1826
| Doubtful; For piano
|-
| 336
| data-sort-value="999.115" | Anh.I/15
| data-sort-value="XXX,1897" | (1897)
| data-sort-value="2103,026" | XXI, 3No. 26
| data-sort-value="801,00" | VIII, 1
| Minuet with Trio, D Anh. I/15
| data-sort-value="key D major" | D major
| data-sort-value="ZZZZ" |
| Doubtful; For piano
|-
| data-sort-value="999.0999116" |
| data-sort-value="999.116" | Anh.I/16
| data-sort-value="XXX,1975" | (1975)
| data-sort-value="ZZZZ" |
| data-sort-value="ZZZZ" |
| data-sort-value="Ecossaise, D 158" | Écossaise de Vienne
| data-sort-value="key A-flat major" | A major
| data-sort-value="1821-01-01" | 1821?
| data-sort-value="Doubtful: by Huttenbrenner?; For piano" | Doubtful: by Hüttenbrenner?; For piano
|-
| data-sort-value="999.0999117" |
| data-sort-value="999.117" | Anh.I/17
| data-sort-value="ZZZZ" |
| data-sort-value="ZZZZ" |
| data-sort-value="801,00" | VIII, 1
| Tantum ergo, D Anh. I/17
| data-sort-value="key B-flat major" | B major
| data-sort-value="ZZZZ" |
| data-sort-value="Text by Aquinas, Thomas, Tantum ergo 7" | Text by Aquinas (other settings: , 461, 730, 739, 750 and 962); Spurious?; Fragment: only s part
|-
| 132
| data-sort-value="999.118" | Anh.I/18
| data-sort-value="XXX,1974" | (1974)
| data-sort-value="ZZZZ" |
| data-sort-value="304,A2" | III, 4Anh. I No. 2
| Lied beim Rundetanz
| data-sort-value="text Auf! es dunkelt; silbern funkelt 2" | Auf, es dunkelt, silbern funkelt
| data-sort-value="1815-01-01" | 1815–1816
| data-sort-value="Text by Salis-Seewis, Johann Gaudenz von, Auf! es dunkelt; silbern funkelt 2" | Text by Salis-Seewis; Doubtful; Fragment: one voice of a part song
|-
| 133
| data-sort-value="999.119" | Anh.I/19
| data-sort-value="XXX,1974" | (1974)
| data-sort-value="ZZZZ" |
| data-sort-value="304,A3" | III, 4Anh. I No. 3
| Lied im Freien, D Anh. I/19
| data-sort-value="text Wie schon ist's im Freien 2" | Wie schön ist's im Freien
| data-sort-value="1815-01-01" | 1815–1816
| data-sort-value="Text by Salis-Seewis, Johann Gaudenz von, Wie schon ist's im Freien 2" | Text by Salis-Seewis; Doubtful; Fragment: one voice of a part song
|-
| 339
| data-sort-value="999.120" | Anh.I/20
| data-sort-value="XXX,1974" | (1974)
| data-sort-value="ZZZZ" |
| data-sort-value="304,A4" | III, 4Anh. I No. 4
| Amors Macht
| data-sort-value="text Wo Amors Flugel weben" | Wo Amors Flügel weben
| data-sort-value="1815-01-01" | 1815–1816
| data-sort-value="Text by Matthisson, Friedrich von, Wo Amors Flugel weben" | Text by Matthisson; Doubtful; Fragment: one voice of a part song
|-
| 340
| data-sort-value="999.121" | Anh.I/21
| data-sort-value="XXX,1974" | (1974)
| data-sort-value="ZZZZ" |
| data-sort-value="304,A5" | III, 4Anh. I No. 5
| Badelied
| data-sort-value="text Zur Elbe, zur Elbe, des Athers Gewolbe" | Zur Elbe, zur Elbe, des Äthers Gewölbe
| data-sort-value="1815-01-01" | 1815–1816
| data-sort-value="Text by Matthisson, Friedrich von, Zur Elbe, zur Elbe, des Athers Gewolbe" | Text by Matthisson; Doubtful; Fragment: one voice of a part song
|-
| 341
| data-sort-value="999.122" | Anh.I/22
| data-sort-value="XXX,1974" | (1974)
| data-sort-value="ZZZZ" |
| data-sort-value="304,A6" | III, 4Anh. I No. 6
| Sylphen
| data-sort-value="text Was unterm Monde gleicht uns Sylphen flink und leicht" | Was unterm Monde gleicht uns Sylphen flink und leicht
| data-sort-value="1815-01-01" | 1815–1816
| data-sort-value="Text by Matthisson, Friedrich von, Was unterm Monde gleicht uns Sylphen flink und leicht" | Text by Matthisson; Doubtful; Fragment: one voice of a part song
|-
| 425
| data-sort-value="999.123" | Anh.I/23
| data-sort-value="XXX,1974" | (1974)
| data-sort-value="ZZZZ" |
| data-sort-value="304,A7" | III, 4Anh. I No. 7
| Lebenslied, D Anh. I/23
| data-sort-value="text Kommen und Scheiden 2" | Kommen und Scheiden
| data-sort-value="1815-01-01" | 1815–1816
| data-sort-value="Text by Matthisson, Friedrich von, Kommen und Scheiden 2" | Text by Matthisson; Doubtful; Fragment: one voice of a part song; Related to ?
|-
| data-sort-value="999.0999124" |
| data-sort-value="999.124" | Anh.I/24
| data-sort-value="ZZZZ" |
| data-sort-value="ZZZZ" |
| data-sort-value="ZZZZ" |
| Kantate auf den Vater (Cantata to his father)
| data-sort-value="ZZZZ" |
| data-sort-value="1816-01-01" | 27/9/1816
| Doubtful; Lost
|-
| data-sort-value="999.0999125" |
| data-sort-value="999.125" | Anh.I/25
| data-sort-value="ZZZZ" |
| data-sort-value="ZZZZ" |
| data-sort-value="801,00" | VIII, 1
| data-sort-value="Drum Schwester und Bruder" | Drum Schwester und Brüder
| data-sort-value="text Drum Schwester und Bruder singt frohliche Liede" | Drum Schwester und Brüder singt fröhliche Liede
| data-sort-value="1819-10-01" | October1819
| Doubtful; For voices and instruments; Fragment: choir text, and violin II and cello parts extant
|-
| data-sort-value="999.0999126" |
| data-sort-value="999.126" | Anh.I/26
| data-sort-value="ZZZZ" |
| data-sort-value="ZZZZ" |
| data-sort-value="801,00" | VIII, 1
| data-sort-value="Sturmbeschworung" | Sturmbeschwörung
| data-sort-value="text Nirgends Rettung, nirgends Land" | Nirgends Rettung, nirgends Land
| data-sort-value="1840-12-31" | before1840
| Spurious?; For voices; Fragment: s part extant
|-
| data-sort-value="999.0999127" |
| data-sort-value="999.127" | Anh.I/27
| data-sort-value="ZZZZ" |

| data-sort-value="ZZZZ" |

| data-sort-value="ZZZZ" |

| data-sort-value="ZZZZ" |

| data-sort-value="ZZZZ" |

| data-sort-value="ZZZZ" |

| Spurious: fragment of three TTB choirs with winds
|-
| 512
| data-sort-value="999.128" | Anh.I/28
| data-sort-value="ZZZZ" |
| data-sort-value="ZZZZ" |
| data-sort-value="801,00" | VIII, 1
| Klage, D Anh. I/28
| data-sort-value="text Nimmer langer trag ich dieser Leiden Last" | Nimmer länger trag ich dieser Leiden Last
| data-sort-value="1817-01-01" | 
| data-sort-value="Other setting Nimmer trag' ich langer 2" | Other setting: ; Spurious?
|-
| data-sort-value="999.0999129" |
| data-sort-value="999.129" | Anh.I/29
| data-sort-value="ZZZZ" |
| data-sort-value="ZZZZ" |
| data-sort-value="801,00" | VIII, 1
| Kaiser Ferdinand II.
| data-sort-value="text Was reget die Stadt sich in freudiger Hast?" | Was reget die Stadt sich in freudiger Hast?
| data-sort-value="1853-01-01" | 1853 orearlier
| Doubtful
|-
| data-sort-value="999.0999130" |
| data-sort-value="999.130" | Anh.I/30
| data-sort-value="ZZZZ" |

| data-sort-value="ZZZZ" |

| data-sort-value="ZZZZ" |

| data-sort-value="ZZZZ" |

| data-sort-value="ZZZZ" |

| data-sort-value="ZZZZ" |

| Spurious: "Mein Frieden" (Text Ferne, ferne flammen helle Sterne by Heine, C.), publ. in 1823, by another Schubert
|-
| data-sort-value="999.0999131" |
| data-sort-value="999.131" | Anh.I/31
| data-sort-value="ZZZZ" |

| data-sort-value="ZZZZ" |

| data-sort-value="ZZZZ" |

| data-sort-value="ZZZZ" |

| data-sort-value="ZZZZ" |

| data-sort-value="ZZZZ" |

| data-sort-value="Spurious: Adieu!/Lebe wohl!" | Spurious: "Adieu!"/"Lebe wohl!" (Text Voici l'instant suprême by Bélanger after Wetzel, re-translated in German as Schon naht, um uns zu scheiden), publ. in 1824, by 
|-
| data-sort-value="598.1" | 598A
| data-sort-value="999.132" | Anh.I/32
| data-sort-value="ZZZZ" |
| data-sort-value="ZZZZ" |
| data-sort-value="802,A1" | VIII, 2Anh. No. 1
| Themes for thoroughbass exercises
| data-sort-value="ZZZZ" |
| data-sort-value="1811-12-30" | before1812
| Doubtful
|}

Lists of compositions by Franz Schubert
Compositions by Franz Schubert
Schubert